The Match is a reality TV show on Sky One in which a group of celebrities form a football team to compete against a team of former professional footballers (The Legends). The show begins with a large squad of celebrities who train and live together, all aiming to be selected for "The Match" against the team of legends. The show has also been published in Switzerland in 2006 and 2008 on SF 2.

In Great Britain, three editions of the programme have been made, one in early 2004, one in late 2005 and one in October 2006. The program is hosted by Mark Durden-Smith, Ulrika Jonsson (2004) and Zoë Ball (2005 & 2006). The matches are played at St James' Park, Newcastle. In the Swiss version, the matches were held at Espenmoos in St. Gallen (2006) and at Allmend Stadion in Lucerne (2008).

Participants
The show features one of English football's best known managers, Graham Taylor, who manages the celebrity team. Players on the legends team have included Ally McCoist, Matt Le Tissier and John Barnes, among others. Notable members of the celebrities team have included Jonathan Wilkes, Ralf Little, Philip Olivier, MC Harvey, Terry Alderton and Darren Campbell.
The Match has never been won by the celebrities - losing 2-1 in 2004 and 2-0 in 2005 and 2006. The only goal the celebrities have ever scored was one that many believe to be a fluke by Jonathan Wilkes when his apparent cross looped over the head of 63-year-old goalkeeper Peter Bonetti.

In Switzerland, the Celebrities ("Die Promis") lost 1-6 against the Legends ("Die Legenden") in 2006 and 1-2 in 2008.

The Match: Series 3 (2006)
Series 3 of The Match was shown during September and October 2006.

Participants
 Martin Offiah
 Chris Hollins
 Rocky Marshall (dropped in public vote on 6 October)
 Leo Ihenacho (dropped in public vote on 2 October)
 Blair McDonough
 Craig Kelly
 James Hooton (dropped due to injury on 3 October)
 Brian McFadden (dropped in public vote on 4 October)
 Ralf Little
 Jeff Brazier
 Anthony Hutton
 Tommy Craig
 MC Harvey
 Michael Greco (dropped in public vote on 5 October)
 Glenn Lamont
 Darren Campbell
 Danny Young
 Mark Bosnich
 Alex Lawler
 Sam Robertson
 Alec Stewart (Captain)

Final match

Celebrities starting XI

Legends starting XI

Match report 

The Celebrities started the match on top and, for the first 15 minutes, had the vast majority of possession and goal chances. However, when Ian Rush scored for the Legends (a goal typical of his predatory style during his playing career) on 17 minutes, the game turned in the favour of the ex-professionals. For the remainder of the match the Legends used their superior passing ability and vision to keep hold of the ball and keep the Celebrities chances to a bare minimum. The commentary team even mentioned that it had become the most one-sided match in the short history of this fixture.

Celebrity winger MC Harvey was sent off late in the game for a second bookable offence. Upon leaving the field he had a row with goalkeeping coach Tony Coton which sparked aggression between many players and staff of both teams. This explosive reaction from Harvey seemed to amuse some of the Legends players, such as Paul Gascoigne who was seen laughing and making hand gestures.

Match history

See also
FC Nerds
The Club (Australian reality show)

External links
Official Sky One/The Match 3 website
website of the Swiss version "Der Match"

Sky UK original programming
2000s British reality television series
2000s British sports television series
2004 British television series debuts
2006 British television series endings